Earl Rudolph "Bud" Powell (September 27, 1924 – July 31, 1966) was an American jazz pianist and composer. Along with Charlie Parker, Thelonious Monk, Kenny Clarke and Dizzy Gillespie, Powell was a leading figure in the development of modern jazz. His virtuosity led many to call him the Charlie Parker of the piano. Powell was also a composer, and many jazz critics credit his works and his playing as having "greatly extended the range of jazz harmony".

Life and career

Early life
He was born in Harlem, New York, United States. Powell's father was a stride pianist. Powell started classical piano lessons at the age of five. His teacher, hired by his father, was a West Indian man named Rawlins. At 10 years of age, Powell showed interest in the swing music that could be heard all over the neighborhood. He first appeared in public at a rent party, where he mimicked Fats Waller's playing style. The first jazz composition that he mastered was James P. Johnson's "Carolina Shout". Powell's older brother, William, played trumpet and violin, and by the age of 15 Powell was playing in William's band. Powell heard Art Tatum on the radio and tried to match his technique. Powell's younger brother, Richie Powell, was also a noted bebop pianist.

Early to mid-1940s
In his youth Powell listened to the adventurous performances at Uptown House, a venue near his home. This was where Charlie Parker first appeared as a solo act when he briefly lived in New York. Thelonious Monk played at Uptown House. When Monk met Powell he introduced Powell to musicians who were starting to play bebop at Minton's Playhouse. Monk was a resident pianist, and he presented Powell as his protégé. Their mutual affection grew, and Monk became Powell's greatest mentor. Powell eagerly experimented with Monk's idea. Monk's composition "In Walked Bud" is a tribute to their time together in Harlem. Powell was engaged in a series of dance bands, his incubation culminating in becoming the pianist for the swing orchestra of Cootie Williams. In late 1943 he was offered the chance to appear at a nightclub with the quintet of Oscar Pettiford and Dizzy Gillespie, but Powell's mother decided he would continue with the more secure job with the popular Williams.

Powell was the pianist on a handful of Williams's recording dates in 1944. The last included the first recording of Monk's "'Round Midnight". His job with Williams was terminated in Philadelphia in January 1945. After the band finished for the night, Powell wandered near Broad Street Station and was apprehended, drunk, by the private railroad police. He was beaten by them and incarcerated briefly by the city police. Ten days after his release, his headaches persisted and he was hospitalized at Bellevue, an observation ward, and then in a state psychiatric hospital sixty miles away. He remained there for two and a half months.

Powell resumed playing in Manhattan after his release. In 1945–46 he recorded with Frank Socolow, Sarah Vaughan, Dexter Gordon, J. J. Johnson, Sonny Stitt, Fats Navarro, and Kenny Clarke. Powell became known for his sight-reading and his skill at fast tempos. Charlie Parker chose Powell to be his pianist on a May 1947 quintet recording session with Miles Davis, Tommy Potter, and Max Roach; this was the only studio session in which Parker and Powell played together.

Hospitalization (1947–1948) 
The Parker session was the only appearance that Powell made in a studio in 1947 besides his Jan 10 recording date with Curly Russell and Max Roach for the album Bud Powell Trio. In November, he had an altercation with a customer at a bar in Harlem. In the ensuing fight, Powell was hit over his eye with a bottle. When the staff at Harlem Hospital found him incoherent and rambunctious, they sent him to Bellevue, which had a record of his previous confinements. He was sent to Creedmoor State Hospital, where he spent eleven months. Powell adjusted to being in the hospital, though in psychiatric interviews he expressed feelings of persecution founded in racism. From February to April 1948, he received electroconvulsive therapy after an outburst which may have been prompted by learning from his girlfriend that she was pregnant with their child. The electroconvulsive therapy was considered ineffective, so the doctors gave him a second series of treatments in May. He was released in October 1948.

Solo and trio recordings (1949–1958) 

After a brief hospitalization in early 1949, Powell made several recordings over the next two and a half years, most of them for Blue Note, Mercury, Norgran, and Clef. He also recorded that summer for two independent producers, a session that resulted in eight masters. Max Roach and Curly Russell were his accompanists. The recordings were unreleased till 1950, when Roost Records bought the masters and released them on a series of 78 rpm records. Musicologist Guthrie Ramsey wrote of the session that "Powell proves himself the equal of any of the other beboppers in technique, versatility, and feeling." The first Blue Note session in August 1949 included Fats Navarro, Sonny Rollins, Tommy Potter and Roy Haynes, and the compositions "Bouncing with Bud" and "Dance of the Infidels". The second Blue Note session in 1951 was a trio with Curley Russell and Max Roach and included "Parisian Thoroughfare" and "Un Poco Loco". The latter was selected by literary critic Harold Bloom for his short list of the greatest works of twentieth-century American art. Sessions for Granz included Ray Brown, George Duvivier, Percy Heath, Roach, Russell, Lloyd Trotman, Art Blakey, Kenny Clarke, Osie Johnson, Buddy Rich, and Art Taylor.

Powell's rivalry with Parker led to feuding and bitterness on the bandstand. Contributing factors were Powell's worsening mental and physical health. Powell recorded for Blue Note and Granz throughout the 1950s, interrupted by another stay in a psychiatric facility from late 1951 to early 1953 after being arrested for possession of heroin. He was released into the guardianship of Oscar Goodstein, owner of the Birdland nightclub. A 1953 trio session for Blue Note with Duvivier and Taylor included Powell's composition "Glass Enclosure", the title inspired possibly by his near-imprisonment in Goodstein's apartment. On May 15, 1953 he played at Massey Hall in Toronto with the quintet, including Charlie Parker, Dizzy Gillespie, Charles Mingus, and Max Roach. The performance was recorded and released by Debut Records as the album  Jazz at Massey Hall. After being released from the hospital, his piano playing was negatively affected by the Largactil he was taking as treatment for schizophrenia.  In 1956 his brother Richie Powell and trumpeter Clifford Brown were killed in a car crash.

Paris (1959–1963)
After several more periods in the hospital, Powell moved to Paris in 1959 with Altevia "Buttercup" Edwards and her son, John. Powell had met Edwards directly after an incarceration in 1954. The couple and child moved into the Hotel La Louisiane. She managed his finances and his medicine. Powell continued to perform and record.

Last years (1964–1966)
In 1963, Powell contracted tuberculosis. During the next year, he returned to New York to perform at Birdland with drummer Horace Arnold and bassist John Ore. His performances during these years were adversely affected by his alcoholism. His emotions became unbalanced, and he was hospitalized in New York after months of erratic behavior and self-neglect. On July 31, 1966, he died of tuberculosis, malnutrition, and alcoholism. He was given the last rites of the Catholic Church.

Music
Bud Powell was influenced primarily by Thelonious Monk and Art Tatum.

His solos featured an attacking style similar to that of horn players, contained frequent arpeggios, and utilized much chromaticism.

His comping often consisted of single bass notes outlining the root and fifth. He used voicings of the root and the tenth or the root with the minor seventh.

Reception and influence
Miles Davis in his autobiography said of Powell: "[He] was one of the few musicians I knew who could play, write, and read all kinds of music." "Bud was a genius piano player – the best there was of all the bebop piano players."

In 1986 Francis Paudras wrote a book about his friendship with Powell, translated into English in 1997 as Dance of the Infidels: A Portrait of Bud Powell. The book was the basis for Round Midnight, a film inspired by the lives of Powell and Lester Young, in which Dexter Gordon played the lead role of an expatriate jazzman in Paris.

Powell influenced countless younger musicians, especially pianists. These included Horace Silver, Wynton Kelly, Andre Previn, McCoy Tyner, Cedar Walton, and Chick Corea. Corea debuted a song called "Bud Powell" on his live album with Gary Burton, In Concert, Zürich, October 28, 1979, and in 1997 dedicated an entire album, Remembering Bud Powell to him.

Bill Evans, who described Powell as his single greatest influence, paid the pianist a tribute in 1979: "If I had to choose one single musician for his artistic integrity, for the incomparable originality of his creation and the grandeur of his work, it would be Bud Powell. He was in a class by himself".

Herbie Hancock said of Powell, in a Down Beat magazine interview in 1966: "He was the foundation out of which stemmed the whole edifice of modern jazz piano".

Jazz pianist Bill Cunliffe said Powell was "the first pianist to take Charlie Parker's language and adapt it successfully to the piano." This was, in part, due to his desire to see the pianist get the adulation usually reserved for the saxophonist or trumpeter.

The drummer Art Taylor, who is listed among the personnel on about a dozen Powell recordings, elicited comments concerning Powell from numerous musicians in his 1993 book of interviews, Notes and Tones.  Among the comments were these:
 Art Blakey: "I think there was a time when Bud Powell was playing more than Charlie Parker."
 Don Cherry: "Bud... could play the same thing differently each time."
 Kenny Clarke: "An exceptional musician."
 Erroll Garner: "Bud was the second greatest thing to Art Tatum... Bud was a genius on the piano."
 Hampton Hawes: "Bud Powell was the greatest be-bop piano player in the world.  Nobody could phrase like him."
 Freddie Hubbard: "To me, they [Bud Powell and Dizzy Gillespie] were true geniuses to create something that spontaneous."
 Elvin Jones: "I always had the impression that Bud had been hurt so much. He was like a very delicate piece of china. I think he was an extremely sensitive person, a very beautiful person.  He was really nice, and I loved him. I thought he was a genius in what he was doing. His ideas about modern music were revolutionary. There are very few pianists even now who have approached the level of proficiency which Bud Powell attained and consistently maintained. He's one of the masters."
 Carmen McRae: "He was a phenomenal pianist, a cat whose potential never really got where it could have gotten to.  I think our way of American life has a lot to do with it."
 Max Roach: "Bud Powell played a major part in my development."
 Sonny Rollins: "In my opinion, Bud was a genius just like Bird. They were untouchable as far as their musicianship was concerned.  They could do no wrong in anything they did..."
 Randy Weston:  "Without a doubt he is one of our leaders."
 Tony Williams: "I wish I had been born earlier because of that whole period with Bud and Bird."

Discography

References

Sources

External links 

 
 Bud Powell discography
 "Bud Powell Anthology" – essays and transcriptions by Ethan Iverson

1924 births
1966 deaths
20th-century American pianists
Musicians from New York City
American jazz pianists
American male pianists
Bebop pianists
Blue Note Records artists
ESP-Disk artists
RCA Victor artists
Verve Records artists
20th-century deaths from tuberculosis
Alcohol-related deaths in New York City
Tuberculosis deaths in New York (state)
American expatriates in France
African-American jazz pianists
Jazz musicians from New York (state)
20th-century American male musicians
American male jazz musicians
Black Lion Records artists
20th-century African-American musicians
African-American Catholics